Algutsboda is a community in Kalmar County, Sweden.
Author Vilhelm Moberg (1898-1973) was born and grew up in Algutsboda, which is in the region called Småland.

Sister cities
 Chisago City - Minnesota, USA

Populated places in Kalmar County